St. Thomas More Catholic Secondary School is a Catholic secondary school located in Hamilton. It is a part of the Hamilton-Wentworth Catholic District School Board and is located on the west side of the Hamilton Mountain. It serves the south-west of Hamilton as well as parts of Glanbrook and Ancaster.

It is the largest school in Hamilton, holding over 2,250 students and graduates approximately 400 students each year, with around 90% of them going pursuing post-secondary education. The school's 200 member staff are involved in numerous activities, sports and associations.

Athletics 
The school prides itself on its athletics as it has over 70 teams that have each won a championship at least once in the school's history. The biggest teams are the football, basketball, hockey, track and field, baseball and soccer teams. STM also has many teams and clubs not found in most schools, like girls' hockey and slo-pitch teams as well as field hockey teams and rugby sevens.

Uniforms 
St. Thomas More's school colours are black and gold. The school has strict rules and consequences for violations in school dress code. There are some exceptional days (during an important game, celebration or holiday), where students can wear specially designed "spirit wear". Designs ranging from clothes representing school clubs and teams to clothes featuring the school mascot (STM Knights).

Sports

Football 
St. Thomas More has one of the most prominent and highly decorated football programs in Ontario and Canada. Having won for their first ever junior championship in 1975 and their first ever senior championship in 1984. The Knights have won 13 total junior championships (1975, 1997, 1999, 2000, 2009, 2012, 2013, 2014, 2015, 2016, 2018, 2019, 2021) and 13 total senior varsity league championships (1984, 2000, 2001, 2006, 2007, 2008, 2010, 2014, 2016, 2017, 2018,  2019, 2021). The Senior Knights are consistently among the highest ranked football teams in Canada. They have also won 7 OFSAA Bowl Championships (2006, 2007, 2015, 2016, 2017, 2018, 2019).

In 2007, 2017, 2018, and 2019 they were ranked the #1 high school football team in Canada and became the first school to ever be ranked #1 in Canada three years in a row, never losing their #1 rank in that entire span.

Girls' basketball 
St. Thomas More is a long-standing, provincial power in girls' basketball at the senior varsity level. The program has won league titles in 1988, 1989, 1991, 1994, 2003, 2004, 2007, 2008, 2013 and 2014 as well as capturing 4 OFSAA "AAAA" gold medals in 2004, 2011, 2012, 2013. Their long-time, main league rival is St. Mary CSS, who is also considered to be an elite level program with multiple OFSAA titles.

Notable alumni 
 Nicole Arbour – comedian, actress, and YouTuber
 Ian Bennett – professional indoor soccer player
 David Braid – jazz pianist and composer
 Shai Gilgeous-Alexander – Oklahoma City Thunder
 Colin Jenkins – Canadian Olympian 2008 Olympic Games Triathlon
 Ashley Leggat – actress
 Darnell Nurse – Edmonton Oilers
 Kia Nurse – Canada women's national basketball team
 Ryan Raposo – soccer player for the Vancouver Whitecaps
 Anthony Romaniw – Canadian Olympian (800m)
 Alena Sharp – LPGA Tour
 Darnell Nurse - NHL

See also 
 List of secondary schools in Ontario

References

External links 
 

High schools in Hamilton, Ontario
Catholic secondary schools in Ontario
Educational institutions established in 1972
1972 establishments in Ontario